Eucoptocnemis is a genus of moths of the family Noctuidae.

Selected species
Eucoptocnemis canescens Lafontaine, 2004
Eucoptocnemis dapsilis (Grote, 1882)
Eucoptocnemis elingua (Smith, 1903)
Eucoptocnemis dolli Grote, 1882 (formerly Agrotis dolli)
Eucoptocnemis fimbriaris (Guenée, 1852) (syn: Eucoptocnemis tripars (Walker, 1856))
Eucoptocnemis rufula Lafontaine, 2004

References
Natural History Museum Lepidoptera genus database
Eucoptocnemis at funet

Noctuinae
Moth genera